The TL Ultralight TL-22 Duo is a Czech ultralight trike that was designed and produced by TL Ultralight of Hradec Králové. Production has been completed, but when it was available the aircraft was supplied as a complete ready-to-fly-aircraft or as a kit for amateur construction.

Design and development
It features a cable-braced hang glider-style high-wing, weight-shift controls, a two-seats-in-tandem open cockpit with a cockpit fairing, tricycle landing gear with wheel pants and a single engine in pusher configuration.

The aircraft is made from bolted-together aluminum tubing, with a fibreglass cockpit fairing and its double surface wing covered in Dacron sailcloth. The standard powerplant used is a twin cylinder, liquid-cooled, two-stroke, dual-ignition  Rotax 582 engine.

Operational history
By 1998 the company reported that 50 aircraft were flying.

Specifications (TL-22 Duo)

References

External links

Photo of a TL-22 Duo

TL-22 Duo
1990s Czech and Czechoslovakian sport aircraft
1990s Czech and Czechoslovakian ultralight aircraft
Homebuilt aircraft
Single-engined pusher aircraft
Ultralight trikes